Lewie Jacob Coyle (born 15 October 1995) is an English professional footballer who plays for  club Hull City as a right back.

Career

Leeds United
Coyle started his footballing life at Leeds United and hit the headlines as a 10-year-old when he was involved in an alleged tapping-up scandal with Chelsea. Coyle's father alleged that he was offered £10,000 'in readies' and the promise of a new kitchen if his son were to attend a one-week trial with the Premier League champions. It was also claimed that Spanish giants Barcelona had made an offer for Coyle around the same time.

Coyle made his first start on 9 January 2016 against Rotherham United to help Leeds advance to the fourth round of the FA Cup in a 2–0 victory.

On 26 October 2016, Coyle picked up a knee injury in normal time against Norwich City in the English League Cup. His injury was after Leeds had used all their substitutes and saw Leeds down to 10 men for all of the 30 minutes of extra time; however they managed to secure a penalty shootout victory after a 2–2 draw. On 3 November, despite being out injured, Coyle signed a two-year extension deal at the club to run until the end of the 2019 season.

On 9 January 2017, Coyle made his return from injury in Leeds' 2–1 FA Cup win against Cambridge United. On 13 January 2017, Coyle made his first start in the League of the 2016–17 season in a 1–0 win against Derby County to send Leeds third in the EFL Championship table. On 29 January 2017, Coyle gave away a costly penalty against Sutton United in the FA Cup. The penalty, converted by Jamie Collins, saw Leeds knocked out in a 1–0 defeat.

Fleetwood Town

On 4 July 2017, Coyle agreed a new three-year deal with Leeds United, running until 2020 and, the same day, went out on a season-long loan to League One club Fleetwood Town, for the 2017–18 season, linking up with one of his former Leeds head coaches, Uwe Rosler.

Coyle impressed early on for Fleetwood, receiving several man of the match awards in his first few games. On 6 November 2017, Coyle received the first red card of his career after being sent off in Fleetwood's FA Cup 2–1 victory against Chorley. On 6 January 2018, Coyle also was part of the side who caused an FA Cup upset, earning a replay after a 0–0 draw against Premier League opponents Leicester City. In January, facing an injury and suspension crisis under then head coach Thomas Christiansen, Leeds considered recalling Coyle from his loan, but decided to not exercise the recall to ensure a guaranteed run of games at Fleetwood.

In March 2018, Coyle received special praise from new Fleetwood manager John Sheridan, citing him as a player who always gives 100% in training and during the matches and that Coyle was an example to the whole squad. On 24 March 2018, Coyle was nominated for both  Player Of The Year and Young Player Of The Year awards at Fleetwood's annual ceremony. He won the Players' Player of the Year Award and the fan-voted Junior Cod Army Player of the Year Award.

On 27 June 2018, Coyle rejoined Fleetwood Town on a 6-month loan under new manager Joey Barton. He made his second debut for the club on 4 August, starting in the 1–0 loss against AFC Wimbledon. In December, with Leeds facing an injury crisis, Barton was asked if Coyle might return to his parent club in January. He said: "for us he has been first class; he trains properly, he is willing to learn, open all ears and is keen on developing as a player. For me he is a pleasure to work with, someone who you would love at your football club".

Barton converted Coyle into a central midfielder and left-back over the second half of the season, with forward Wes Burns occupying Coyle's usual right-back slot. Barton praised Coyle for his versatility and his performances in his new positions. Coyle made 45 appearances for Fleetwood in all competitions in his second spell at the club.

Coyle made it three consecutive loan spells with Fleetwood Town when he joined ahead of the 2019–20 season. The deal was made permanent in January 2020 when he signed a three-and-a-half-year contract.

Hull City
On 7 August 2020, Coyle signed for Hull City on a three-year deal with an optional 12-month extension for an undisclosed fee. Coyle made his debut on 20 October 2020 in the 1–0 home win against AFC Wimbledon. He faced his former team in the EFL Trophy on 12 January 2021, and deep in extra-time scored his first goal for Hull City to give them a 3–2 victory over Fleetwood Town and allow Hull to progress to the fourth round of the competition.

On 28 July 2022, Coyle was appointed club captain for the 2022–23 season.

Personal life

A sporting family, Coyle's eldest brother Tommy is a professional boxer and former Commonwealth lightweight champion. His younger brother Rocco is at Hull City in the Youth Academy after joining from Leeds United. His elder brother Joe is a professional golfer.

Honours

Hull City
EFL League One: 2020–21

Individual
PFA Team of the Year: 2020–21 League One
Fleetwood Town Players' Player of the Year Award: 2017–18,
Fleetwood Town Junior Cod Army Player of the Year: 2017–18

Career statistics

References 

1995 births
Living people
Footballers from Kingston upon Hull
English footballers
Association football defenders
Leeds United F.C. players
Harrogate Town A.F.C. players
Fleetwood Town F.C. players
Hull City A.F.C. players
National League (English football) players
English Football League players